Mzilikazi High School (also known locally, in Ndebele, as eMgandane), is a government-maintained F1 (i.e. academic) secondary school named in recognition of the Ndebele king Mzilikazi, the founder of the Ndebele Nation. The School is in the city of Bulawayo, Zimbabwe, located along the Old Falls Road, a road that used to link Bulawayo with the Victoria Falls. It is located very close to the famous Mpilo Hospital of Bulawayo. Mzilikazi High School is physically located between Greenspan Suburb (and Cemetery) and Mzilikazi Township. 

In the history of the Ndebele Kingdom, Mzilikazi High School draws most of its students from local feeder primary schools named after other Ndebele Royal figures, such as Mzilikazi himself; his son, Lobhengula; Lobhengula's Queen, Lozikeyi; and other leaders, such as Lotshe. Thus, notable primary schools whose ex-pupils proceed onto Mzilikazi High School for secondary school education include: Mzilikazi Primary School, Lobhengula Primary School, Lotshe Primary School, and Lozikeyi Primary School. Others include St. Patrick's Primary School and St. Columbus Primary School. 

Mzilikazi Secondary School is well known for its excellent academic achievements and sporting excellence. The Mzilikazi boys football team have won the COPA Coca-Cola Tournament four times at the National level, having been the winners of the debut Tournament in 1989 as well as 1993, 1999, and 2001. Mzilikazi High School holds the highest number of COPA Coca-Cola wins in the whole of Bulawayo.

Notable alumni

Some of Zimbabwe's top footballers were groomed here, like Peter Ndlovu (who has played for Coventry City FC, Birmingham City FC, and Huddersfield FC and is currently plying his trade in South Africa), the late Benjamin Konjera, and the late Adam Ndlovu.

Yvonne Vera, the late internationally recognised novelist, and Prof Welshman Ncube, law professor and prominent opposition politician, are also alumni. NoViolet Bulawayo, the famous novelist, also attended the school.

References

ADDRESS
P.O Box 962
Victoria Falls Rd Mzilikazi, Bulawayo, Zimbabwe

PHONE NUMBER
09 200005

High schools in Zimbabwe
Education in Bulawayo